Deer Park is a census-designated place (CDP) in Napa County, California, United States. The population was 1,267 at the 2010 census. It is part of the Napa, California Metropolitan Statistical Area. Its area code is 707. Its zip code is 94576. It is in the Pacific time zone. Deer Creek is where Elmshaven, a large Victorian home lived in by Ellen White in the early twentieth century, is located.

History

The Glass Fire caused significant damage throughout Deer Park in late September 2020, destroying numerous houses as well as much of the Foothills Adventist Elementary School.

Geography
Deer Park is located at  (38.537257, -122.472386).

Demographics

2010
The 2010 United States Census reported that Deer Park had a population of 1,267. The racial makeup of Deer Park was 1,108 (87.5%) White, 13 (1.0%) African American, 9 (0.7%) Native American, 51 (4.0%) Asian, 0 (0.0%) Pacific Islander, 61 (4.8%) from other races, and 25 (2.0%) from two or more races. Hispanic or Latino of any race were 147 persons (11.6%).

The Census reported that 1,245 people (98.3% of the population) lived in households, 5 (0.4%) lived in non-institutionalized group quarters, and 17 (1.3%) were institutionalized.

There were 564 households, out of which 114 (20.2%) had children under the age of 18 living in them, 281 (49.8%) were opposite-sex married couples living together, 44 (7.8%) had a female householder with no husband present, 15 (2.7%) had a male householder with no wife present.  There were 31 (5.5%) unmarried opposite-sex partnerships, and 4 (0.7%) same-sex married couples or partnerships. 174 households (30.9%) were made up of individuals, and 67 (11.9%) had someone living alone who was 65 years of age or older. The average household size was 2.21.  There were 340 families (60.3% of all households); the average family size was 2.67.

The population was spread out, with 191 people (15.1%) under the age of 18, 68 people (5.4%) aged 18 to 24, 245 people (19.3%) aged 25 to 44, 488 people (38.5%) aged 45 to 64, and 275 people (21.7%) who were 65 years of age or older.  The median age was 51.9 years. For every 100 females, there were 91.1 males.  For every 100 females age 18 and over, there were 87.5 males.

The homeowner vacancy rate was 2.2%; the rental vacancy rate was 6.0%.  764 people (60.3% of the population) lived in owner-occupied housing units and 481 people (38.0%) lived in rental housing units.

2000
As of the census of 2000, there were 1,433 people, 575 households, and 395 families residing in the CDP. The racial makeup of the CDP in 2010 was 81.4% non-Hispanic White, 1.0% non-Hispanic Black or African American, 0.4% Native American, 4.0% Asian, 0.1% from other races, and 1.5% from two or more races. 11.6% of the population were Hispanic or Latino of any race.

Deer Park is home to a small but growing population of Argentine Americans already approaching 4 percent of the population of the small hamlet.

There were 575 households, out of which 26.6% had children under the age of 18 living with them, 59.0% were married couples living together, 6.4% had a female householder with no husband present, and 31.3% were non-families. 24.7% of all households were made up of individuals, and 6.4% had someone living alone who was 65 years of age or older.  The average household size was 2.45 and the average family size was 2.88.

In the CDP, the population was spread out, with 19.7% under the age of 18, 6.9% from 18 to 24, 27.6% from 25 to 44, 30.9% from 45 to 64, and 14.8% who were 65 years of age or older.  The median age was 43 years. For every 100 females, there were 95.2 males.  For every 100 females age 18 and over, there were 94.9 males.

The median income for a household in the CDP was $63,833, and the median income for a family was $69,741. Males had a median income of $45,197 versus $40,750 for females. The per capita income for the CDP was $34,665.  About 3.1% of families and 4.3% of the population were below the poverty line, including 4.3% of those under age 18 and none of those age 65 or over.

Government

References

Census-designated places in Napa County, California
Vaca Mountains
Census-designated places in California